Tynong railway station is located on the Gippsland line in Victoria, Australia. It serves the town of Tynong, and it opened on 12 February 1880.

In 1953, the line from Nar Nar Goon was duplicated, with electrification between Pakenham and Warragul occurring in 1954. In 1956, the line to Bunyip was duplicated, and in 1957, the present island platform was provided, when duplication of the line was provided through the station.

Rail sidings were once provided at Tynong, however they were withdrawn in 1978/1979. On 1 October 1979, freight services to and from the station were withdrawn. A further siding was removed in 1982.

In 1998, electrified services between Pakenham and Warragul ceased, with de-electrification between those stations occurring in 2001.

Platforms and services

Tynong has one island platform with two faces. It is serviced by V/Line Traralgon and selected Bairnsdale line services.

Platform 1:
  services to Southern Cross in the morning and early afternoon
  services to Traralgon and Bairnsdale in the late afternoon and evening

Platform 2:
  services to Traralgon and Bairnsdale in the morning and early afternoon
  services to Southern Cross in the late afternoon and evening

Transport links

Warragul Bus Lines operates two routes via Tynong station, under contract to Public Transport Victoria:

 Garfield station – Nar Nar Goon station
 Pakenham station – Garfield station

References

External links
Victorian Railway Stations Gallery
Melway map

Railway stations in Australia opened in 1880
Regional railway stations in Victoria (Australia)
Railway stations in the Shire of Cardinia